Syed Khalid Ahmed is a Pakistani politician who had been a Member of the Provincial Assembly of Sindh, from May 2013 to May 2018.

Early life and education
He was born on 13 November 1965 in Karachi.

He has a degree of Bachelor of Commerce, a degree of Master of Arts in Political Science and a degree of Master of Arts in Islamic History, all from Karachi University.

Political career
He was elected to the Provincial Assembly of Sindh as a candidate of Mutahida Quami Movement from Constituency PS-122 KARACHI-XXXIV in 2013 Pakistani general election.

References

Living people
Sindh MPAs 2013–2018
1965 births
Muttahida Qaumi Movement politicians
University of Karachi alumni